The West Nipissing Lynx are a junior ice hockey team based in Sturgeon Falls, Ontario, Canada.  They play in the Greater Metro Junior A Hockey League (GMHL).

History
The Sturgeon Falls Lumberjacks were announced in summer 2010.  The Lumberjacks replaced the folded Nipissing Alouettes, who left the GMHL in 2009.

On September 10, 2010, the Lumberjacks played their first game against the Elliot Lake Bobcats in Elliot Lake.  The Bobcats won the game 7–2.  On September 12, 2010, the Lumberjacks played on the road against the Powassan Dragons and earned their franchise's first victory with a 5–2 win.

In their second season, the Lumberjacks finished second place in the GMHL with a record of 35 wins and 7 losses.  In the league quarterfinals, the Lumberjacks faced the 2010 league champion Deseronto Storm and survived a five-game series 3-games-to-2.  In the semifinals, Sturgeon Falls defeated the league's only two-time champion, the Bradford Rattlers, in a four-game sweep.  In the finals, the Lumberjacks drew the first-seeded Temiscaming Titans.  Despite being an expansion team, the Titans were created with the remnants of the Northern Ontario Junior Hockey League's Temiscaming Royals, and were a seasoned and tough team.  The Titans finished the season ahead of the Lumberjacks with a record of 38 wins and 4 losses and were undefeated through two rounds of playoffs (7–0).  The Lumberjacks quickly went up two games on the Titans, but were defeated in game three.  The Lumberjacks took game four but the Titans took game five.  Game six was in Sturgeon Falls and the Lumberjacks earned a 6–1 victory and their first Russell Cup as GMHL Champions.

On September 29, 2012, the Lumberjacks became the first GMHL club to ice a female hockey player.  Goaltender Alyssa Moyer made her GMHL debut in a 7–5 loss to the Shelburne Red Wings, making 21 saves.

In January 2016, the team announced that it could not finish the 2015–16 season due to lack of uninjured players but planned to return for the 2016–17 season.

In June 2016, Lumberjacks' owner Lui Ricci sold the team to two local owners looking to re-energize the team. The team was then re-branded as the West Nipissing Lynx.

Season-by-season records

References

External links
Lynx Webpage
GMHL Webpage

2010 establishments in Ontario
Ice hockey clubs established in 2010
Ice hockey teams in Ontario
West Nipissing